Franchise Pictures LLC was an independent motion picture production and distribution company, founded by Elie Samaha, Ashok Amritraj, and Andrew Stevens. They were known for their production in the action film genre. The company also had a short-lived video game arm, Franchise Interactive.

As of 2021, half of the Franchise Pictures library, along with that of ThinkFilm, is now owned by Orange Holdings LLC. Another half of the Franchise Pictures library is owned by Revolution Studios (via Morgan Creek Productions).

In 2004, in a case heard before a jury in a Los Angeles federal courtroom, Intertainment Licensing GmbH v. Franchise Pictures, et al., Judge Stotler awarded a plaintiff's verdict for $121.7 million against Franchise Pictures and Elie Samaha for fraudulent accounting. Samaha vowed to appeal but the fraud judgment destroyed Franchise's viability; the company and its subsidiaries all filed Chapter 11 bankruptcy petitions on August 19, 2007.

History 
Franchise Pictures was started in 1997, with Phoenician Entertainment serving as subsidiary for lower-budget films. Its initial employees were Elie Samaha and Ashok Amritraj, who would later leave two years later to start Hyde Park Entertainment. 

On October 8, 1998, it signed a distribution agreement with Morgan Creek Productions and Warner Bros. Pictures, in which Franchise paid the distribution rights to both Morgan Creek and WB. On May 19, 1999, the company had signed a deal with Intertainment in order to bring all 60 motion pictures that Franchise had been receiving to Germany. A month later, Intertainment had struck a distribution deal with Warner Bros. Pictures, in order to secure the rights to 60 motion pictures for worldwide distribution.

On July 2, 2001, Morgan Creek and its CEO James G. Robinson sued Franchise Pictures for breach of contract, resulting in Morgan Creek to end their partnership with Franchise Pictures after the release of Heist (2001).

During Franchise's partnership with Morgan Creek, by 2000, the companies had financial success with a film titled The Whole Nine Yards. However, they also suffered a huge flop with Battlefield Earth starring John Travolta, which received bad word-of-mouth and grossed $29.7 million on a $75 million budget.

Filmography

Bankruptcy
Following the financial failure of Battlefield Earth and other films independently produced by Franchise Pictures, The Wall Street Journal reported that the United States' Federal Bureau of Investigation was probing "the question of whether some independent motion picture companies have vastly inflated the budget of films in an effort to scam investors". In December 2000 the German-based Intertainment AG filed a lawsuit alleging that Franchise Pictures had fraudulently inflated budgets in films including Battlefield Earth, which Intertainment had helped to finance. Intertainment had agreed to pay 47% of the production costs of several films in exchange for European distribution rights, but ended up paying for between 60% and 90% of the costs instead. The company alleged that Franchise had defrauded it to the tune of over $75 million by systematically submitting "grossly fraudulent and inflated budgets".

The case was heard before a jury in a Los Angeles federal courtroom in May–June 2004. The court heard testimony from Intertainment that according to Franchise's bank records the real cost of Battlefield Earth was only $44 million, not the $75 million declared by Franchise. The remaining $31 million had been fraudulent "padding". Intertainment's head Barry Baeres told the court that he had only funded Battlefield Earth because it was packaged as a slate that included two more commercially attractive films, the Wesley Snipes vehicle The Art of War and the Bruce Willis comedy The Whole Nine Yards. Baeres testified that "Mr. Samaha said, 'If you want the other two pictures, you have to take Battlefield Earth—it's called packaging'". Baeres commented: "We would have been quite happy if he had killed Battlefield Earth".

Intertainment won the case and was awarded $121.7 million in damages, of which Samaha himself was declared by the court to be personally liable for $77 million in damages. However, the jury rejected Intertainment's claims under the Racketeer Influenced and Corrupt Organizations (RICO) statute, which would have trebled the damages if Franchise had been found liable on that charge. Samaha vowed to appeal but the fraud judgment destroyed Franchise's viability; the company and its subsidiaries all filed Chapter 11 bankruptcy petitions on August 19, 2007.

References

Defunct film and television production companies of the United States
Fraud in the United States
Mass media companies established in 1997
Mass media companies disestablished in 2007
Companies that filed for Chapter 11 bankruptcy in 2007
American independent film studios